RotFront (often prefixed with: "Emigrantski Raggamuffin Kollektiv") is a world music band from Berlin.

History 
The group was founded in 2003 as  Emigrantski Raggamuffin Kollektiv RotFront  by Ukrainian Yuriy Gurzhy together with Wladimir Kaminer and Hungarian Simon Wahorn.

Other artists occasionally performed with RotFront. The number of musicians on stage sometimes reached fifteen. Actress and singer Dorka Gryllus is a former band member.

The German World Music Award Ruth was awarded in 2010 to RotFront for their performance at folk music festival TFF Rudolstadt.

Style and background 
The band plays in various styles including rock, hip-hop, Dance Hall, reggae, ska and a variety of folk backgrounds.

Song lyrics are written in multiple languages, such as German, English, Russian, Ukrainian and Hungarian.

Discography

Albums 
 Emigrantski Raggamuffin (2009)
 Visa free (May 2011)
 17 German Dances (17 Deutsche Tänze) ( April 2014 )

Compilations 
 B -Style ( compilation contribution to listen to berlin (Berlin Music Commission) 2009)
 Ya Piv (Tiger Hifi Echo Mix) ( 2009)
 Zhenya ( P-Town Remix) ( Compilation contribution to Kaffee Burger  (Duplicate Records) 2006)

External links 
 Official Site
 Myspace page of RotFront
  Yuriy Gurzhy: 'Achtung! The party is Russian-rock-free' . Alexandra Belopolsky,  Café Babel

References 

German folk music groups
German reggae musical groups
German ska groups
2003 establishments in Germany
Musical groups established in 2003
German hip hop groups
Musical groups from Berlin